Roberto Michael Castro (born 15 July 1989) is an Ecuadorian footballer who plays for América de Quito.

Club career
Castro has always played for Deportivo Quito. Castro first broke into the first team squad in 2006. In the 2006 and 2007 seasons, he was used a lot because of his great ability to defend. However, in the 2008 season, he helped Deportivo Quito win the Copa Pilsener 2008. He was a key player in that season and he did start a lot of matches including coming in as a substitute. He started 28 matches and only came as a substitute 1 time in the season.

International career
Castro was part of Ecuador's squad in the 2007 Pan American Games. He was one of the key figures in his country's gold medal win of the tournament. He was also called up to participate in the 2009 South American Youth Championship where Ecuador was eliminated early by a coin toss.

References

External links

1989 births
Living people
Footballers from Quito
Ecuadorian footballers
S.D. Quito footballers
Footballers at the 2011 Pan American Games
Association football central defenders
Pan American Games competitors for Ecuador
Footballers at the 2007 Pan American Games
Medalists at the 2007 Pan American Games
Pan American Games gold medalists for Ecuador
Pan American Games medalists in football